John Kerr Hendrick (October 10, 1849 – June 20, 1921) was a U.S. Representative from Kentucky.

Born in Caswell County, North Carolina, Hendrick moved with his parents to Logan County and later to Todd County, Kentucky, attended private schools and Bethel College, Russellville, Kentucky, moved to Crittenden County, Kentucky, in 1869 and engaged in teaching school. He studied law and was admitted to the bar in 1874, commencing practice in Smithland, Kentucky. He served as prosecuting attorney of Livingston County from 1878 to 1886, and as member of the Kentucky State Senate from 1887 to 1891. During that time, he served as delegate to the 1888 Democratic National Convention.

Hendrick was elected as a Democrat to the Fifty-fourth Congress (March 4, 1895 – March 3, 1897). He was an unsuccessful candidate for renomination in 1896.

He resumed the practice of law in Paducah, Kentucky, where he died June 20, 1921. He was interred in Maplelawn Cemetery.

Footnotes

References

1849 births
1921 deaths
Kentucky lawyers
Democratic Party Kentucky state senators
People from Caswell County, North Carolina
Democratic Party members of the United States House of Representatives from Kentucky
19th-century American lawyers